Alexander Trampitsch (born 5 February 1999) is an Austrian swimmer. He competed in the men's 100 metre freestyle event at the 2018 FINA World Swimming Championships (25 m), in Hangzhou, China.

References

External links
 

1999 births
Living people
Austrian male freestyle swimmers
Place of birth missing (living people)